Allan Carville is a former association football player who represented New Zealand at international level.

Carville made his full All Whites debut in a 1–1 draw with Fiji on 14 November 1988 and ended his international playing career with four A-international caps to his credit, his final cap an appearance in a 0–1 loss to Australia on 12 May 1991.

References 

Year of birth missing (living people)
Living people
New Zealand association footballers
New Zealand international footballers
Association football forwards